Reinhard "Stan" Libuda (10 October 1943 – 25 August 1996) was a German footballer playing on the right wing.

Career
Libuda was born in Wendlinghausen near Lemgo. His tremendous skill as a dribbler was a major factor in Borussia Dortmund's 1966 UEFA Cup Winners' Cup championship and the West Germany national team's hard-won qualification and its third-place finish in the 1970 FIFA World Cup. In the UEFA Cup Winners' Cup Final in 1966 he scored the final goal against Liverpool F.C. to earn a 2–1 extra time victory for Dortmund.

Libuda played for FC Schalke 04 from 1961 until 1976 with two interruptions: from 1965 until 1968 he played for Borussia Dortmund, and 1972–73 for RC Strasbourg.

Between 1963 and 1971, Libuda gained 26 caps for the West Germany national team and scored three goals. In the German Bundesliga he played 264 games and scored 28 goals for FC Schalke 04 and Borussia Dortmund.

Later he was involved in the Bundesligaskandal of 1971. The shy Libuda later suffered from cancer, and died from the complications of a stroke in Gelsenkirchen.

Libuda gained his nickname "Stan" after the English player Stanley Matthews who played in the same position and who was widely praised for his dribbling skills. Fans of Schalke used a 1960s slogan of a German Evangelical Church Assembly Nobody is able to evade Jesus to expand it with – except Stan Libuda. The slogan is part of a musical made about Schalke.

Career statistics

Club

International

Honours
Borussia Dortmund
 UEFA Cup Winners' Cup: 1965–66

Schalke 04
 DFB-Pokal: 1971–72

West Germany
 FIFA World Cup third place: 1970

References

External links
 
 

1943 births
1996 deaths
German footballers
West German footballers
Germany international footballers
Germany under-21 international footballers
West German expatriate footballers
West German expatriate sportspeople in France
Expatriate footballers in France
FC Schalke 04 players
Borussia Dortmund players
RC Strasbourg Alsace players
1970 FIFA World Cup players
Bundesliga players
Ligue 1 players
Association football forwards
Footballers from North Rhine-Westphalia